Padbury Brook  is a stream/river in Oxfordshire and Buckinghamshire; it is a small tributary of the River Great Ouse approximately 12 km in length.

Course 

Padbury brook rises from its source just north of Fringford in Oxfordshire. The brook heads eastward under the A4421 south of Newton Morrell in Oxfordshire, onwards north of Godington, then on into Buckinghamshire. The brook heads eastward, north of Twyford, Buckinghamshire, continuing north of Steeple Claydon, where it was known locally as The planks, to Oxlade bridge near Padbury. Padbury Brook then flows north-east in a wide and shallow valley passing north-east of Padbury, the brook goes under the A413 road, then under the A421 road (Buckingham to Milton Keynes road), then under Thornborough Bridge and on to King's Bridge, where it is then joined by its other arm, from the west (Thornborough) and becomes 'The Twins', before joining the River Great Ouse, east of Buckingham and west of Thornborough.

Wildlife 
Padbury Brook is home to fish such as the stone loach (Barbatula tarantula), spined loach ( Cobitis taenia), the common minnow (Phoxinus phoxinus), the common roach (Rutilus rutilus), the european bullhead (Cottus gobio), and the three-spined stickleback (Gasterosteus aculeatus). Larger fish including european chub (Squalius cephalus), European perch (perca fluviatilis) and European eel (Anguilla anguilla) are also resident in the river. There are also signal crayfish (Pacifastacus leniusculus) in the river with most of the crayfish being small in size with a small number of larger ones. There also be a range of other wildlife such as swans, ducks, voles and myriad types of water insects.

HS2 
Padbury Brook will be impacted by the construction of HS2 and is currently (2021) in the process of having new diversions and new bridges constructed to facilitate the works with minimal impact to the natural environment. Padbury Brook has been subject to industrial activity over its modern history.

Gallery

References

Rivers of Buckinghamshire
Tributaries of the River Great Ouse